Bookmarks is Britain's largest socialist bookshop. It was founded in 1973 by the Socialist Workers Party (SWP) and is based in Bloomsbury, London. The company has published books since 1979 and is the official bookseller for the Trades Union Congress.

The bookshop 
Bookmarks specialises in non-fictional and fictional books that concern politics, economics, anti-fascism, anarchism, labour history, trade unionism, arts and culture, anti-racism, the environment, biographies, and feminism. It also stocks radical books for children, eBooks, CDs, and DVDs. Their range of merchandise includes posters, mugs, bags, and cards. Novelty items stocked by Bookmarks include anti-Tory mugs and 'sherbet Lenin' soap. Live events are streamed from Bookmarks' YouTube channel.

British politician Tony Benn described Bookmarks as "the university for activists." The bookshop is a member of the Alliance of Radical Booksellers.

Premises 
Bookmarks originally began trading in 1971 as I.S. Books and was based at the Cotton Gardens International Socialists office until 1973. Between 1973 and 1974, the name Bookmarks was adopted and new premises were opened at 265 Seven Sisters Road, Finsbury Park, London. In the 1980s, this was also the mailing address for The Radical Bookseller, a magazine for the radical book trade.

In 1998, Bookmarks opened its premises at 1 Bloomsbury Street, London.

Bookmarks Publications 
Bookmarks publishes books and pamphlets that address issues concerning activists and trade unionists. A publishing company has existed in some form since 1979.

2002 libel case 
In August 2002, Bookmarks Publications and editor of the Socialist Review Lindsey German received a letter from libel lawyers at Carter-Ruck representing editor Quintin Hoare and historian Branka Magaš. The complaint concerned a 1993 essay by the political theorist Alex Callinicos included within The Balkans, Nationalism and Imperialism, a book by German published by Bookmarks in 1999. Hoare and Magaš claimed that one passage suggested they were apologists for Franjo Tuđman's regime in Croatia. Bookmarks Publications and German agreed to issue an apologetic statement in open court and pay each of the plaintiffs £1,500. With legal bills estimated above £10,000 a libel fund was launched in 2003 to support Bookmarks in the proceedings. British journalist Paul Foot penned an appeal for support for Alliance for Workers' Liberty and claimed that neither Hoare of Magas had approached Bookmarks Publications without their lawyers. In the article Foot wrote that: "It has been a long tradition in the labour movement that arguments between socialists should be conducted openly and should not, except in extreme circumstances, be tested in the courts by the libel laws."

2005: Gilad Atzmon event and anti-Semitism 

In June 2005 around 30 people attended a picket of Bookmarks organised by Tony Greenstein through Jews Against Zionism. The picket was initiated after the Socialist Workers Party invited jazz musician Gilad Atzmon to a talk at Bookmarks titled "Deconstructing Zionist Identity" on 17 June of the same year. Atzmon's writings have been described by scholars and anti-racism activists as being anti-Semitic and containing Holocaust denial. The Alliance for Workers' Liberty claimed that the basis for the picket was "not good politically" because the organisers' leaflets stated that, "the greatest crime the SWP have committed in inviting Atzmon" is not giving a platform to an anti-Semite but rather "giving ammunition to the Zionist libel that anti-Zionists are, after all, motivated by anti-Semitism". Other attendees of the picket appeared solely for the purpose of denouncing Atzmon and his views.

Jews Against Zionism reported that Atzmon had discussed the theories of Austrian philosopher Otto Weininger at the event and had "not been received well" by attendees. A reporter for Jews Against Zionism wrote that, despite the dismay of some attendees, "we must still marvel at their stupidity in even inviting Atzmon in the first place."

In a statement issued after the event the SWP said, "The SWP does not believe that Gilad Atzmon is a Holocaust denier or racist." An employee of Bookmarks said, "While we do not agree with all of Gilad's ideas and statements… we feel that none justify saying that he should not be allowed to come to the shop to talk about his book."

The Alliance for Workers' Liberty condemned both Bookmarks and the SWP for the incident.

2018: far-right protestors 
On 4 August 2018, far-right protestors entered Bookmarks, wrecked displays, and intimidated staff. The campaign group Stand Up to Racism claimed that one individual wore a Donald Trump mask whilst other assailants held placards reading "British Bolshevik Cult." Bookmarks' manager was called "Corbynite scum." The incident took place after a far-right protest connected to the conspiracy theory website InfoWars. Onsite staff called the police and no arrests were made.

The American philosopher and linguist Noam Chomsky called the incident a "shameful attack." Further messages of support came from the Labour Party politician David Lammy, author Michael Rosen, and singer-songwriter Billy Bragg. A solidarity event held on 11 August of the same year was attended by more than 500 supporters. Michael Rosen wrote a special poem for the event that included the line: "Anytime we think they’re just having a laugh, let’s remember the joker with the toothbrush moustache."

Later that month, the right-wing UK Independence Party announced the suspension of three party members pending an investigation into the incident. The suspension applied to Elizabeth Jones, Luke Nash-Jones and Martin Costello. Jones was later cleared of wrongdoing and reinstated to the party. The campaigning publishing organisation Index on Censorship sent six books to the suspended UKIP members to "introduce them to different ideas". The titles issued included Upton Sinclair's The Jungle, Ray Bradbury's Fahrenheit 451, and Philip Pullman's His Dark Materials Trilogy.

A Bookmarks employee claimed that a previous attack on the shop took place in the 1970s.

Bookmarks' manager, David Gilchrist, wrote in The Guardian that such events sprang from "a fertile ground prepared by Theresa May's “hostile environment” for migrants." Gilchrist's article concluded with: "The most important outcome will be if more people learn the true meaning of solidarity."

External links 
 Official website

References 

Bookshops in London
Socialist organisations in the United Kingdom